Monica Vaughan (15 April 1952) is a retired British athlete and multiple gold medal-winning paralympic swimmer. She was Britain's most successful Paralympian at the 1976 Games in Toronto, winning five gold medals in swimming and a silver medal as the only woman in the British volleyball team. She returned for the 1980 Games in Arhnem, winning a further four gold medals and a silver.

Vaughan had a leg amputated at the age of four and as a teenager she competed against able-bodied athletes for her swimming club, Portsmouth Northsea SC. She worked as a podiatrist before retiring.

References

1952 births
Living people
British female freestyle swimmers
Paralympic swimmers of Great Britain
Paralympic gold medalists for Great Britain
Paralympic silver medalists for Great Britain
Swimmers at the 1976 Summer Paralympics
Swimmers at the 1980 Summer Paralympics
Volleyball players at the 1976 Summer Paralympics
Medalists at the 1976 Summer Paralympics
Medalists at the 1980 Summer Paralympics
Paralympic medalists in swimming
Paralympic medalists in volleyball
British female backstroke swimmers
20th-century British women